The Fenwick Baronetcy, of Fenwick in the County of Northumberland, was a title in the Baronetage of England. It was created on 9 June 1628 for Sir John Fenwick, of Wallington Hall, Northumberland. He sat as Member of Parliament for Northumberland and Cockermouth. The second and third Baronets also represented Northumberland in Parliament. The title became extinct when the third Baronet was executed for treason on 27 January 1697.

The ancient family of Fenwick had its seat from the 12th century at Fenwick Tower, Matfen, Northumberland, and later from the 16th century at Wallington Hall.

Fenwick baronets, of Fenwick (1628)
Sir John Fenwick, 1st Baronet ( – c. 1658)
Sir William Fenwick, 2nd Baronet (c. 1617–1676)
Sir John Fenwick, 3rd Baronet (1644–1697)

References

 Burkes Genealogical and Heraldic History of the Extinct and Dormant Baronetcies of England Ireland and Scotland 2nd ed. (1844) pp. 194–6 Google Books

Extinct baronetcies in the Baronetage of England
People from Matfen